Julia Rebekka Adler (née Mai; born 1978) is a German viola and viola d'amore player.

Early life, family and education

Julia Rebekka Mai was born in Heidelberg. 

She started playing viola at the age of six. Having won first prize at Jugend musiziert (Federal German competition for young musicians), she was invited to participate at the Interlochen Arts Camp and the Aspen Music Festival.  

She studied with Kim Kashkashian, Johannes Lüthy, and Wolfram Christ at the Hochschule für Musik Freiburg and took master classes with Walter Levin and Yuri Bashmet. She finished her soloist-studies with Hartmut Rohde at the Universität der Künste Berlin with highest honors. From 1992 to 1997, she held a scholarship from the Deutsche Stiftung Musikleben. She was selected artist in the Bundesauswahl junger Künstler in both 2005 and 2006. In 2002, Adler was awarded with the Felix Mendelssohn Bartholdy Prize for viola.

Career
In 1994, she recorded her first CD, playing Viola Concerto No.1 by Darius Milhaud as soloist with the Landesjugendorchester Baden-Württemberg. She has appeared as soloist with the Baden-Badener Philharmonie, the Neue Philharmonie Westfalen, the Philharmonisches Kammerorchester München, and the Philharmonia of the Nations directed by Justus Frantz.  Adler played at the Donaueschingen Festival, in projects of the Pellegrini-Quartett, and performed with artists such as Stéphane Picard, Tim Vogler, David Geringas, Antje Weithaas, Wen-Sinn-Yang, Julius Berger, Karl Leister, and Hans-Jörg Schellenberger. 

In 2004, she was rated best German violist in the ARD International Music Competition, receiving the Theodor Rogler Prize. She has been co-soloist of the Munich Philharmonic and was a member of the Kuss Quartett and the Ensemble Viardot. She performs with the Solistenoktett Berlin (a string octet with Latica Honda-Rosenberg and Jens Peter Maintz, among others), and plays in duo with the Russian pianist Jascha Nemtsov. 

In 2009, she recorded the four viola sonatas by Mieczysław Weinberg.

Since 2016, Adler is a professor for viola at the Berlin University of the Arts.

Personal life

Julia Rebekka Adler is married.

References

External links

Julia Rebekka Adler is a NEOS recording artist

Aspen Music Festival and School alumni
German classical violists
Women violists
Mendelssohn Prize winners
Living people
1978 births
Musicians from Heidelberg
Hochschule für Musik Freiburg alumni